Michel Vergé-Franceschi (born 28 October 1951, Toulon) is a French naval historian.

Biography 
Michel Vergé-Franceschi started teaching History in secondary education at Le Havre (1975-1986) at collège Viviani, at the Lycée polyvalent Claude Monet, at the Lycée régional François 1er and at the Lycée Corneille in Rouen, where he was also responsible for the academic plan for teaching History. He earned a PhD in History in 1980 with a dissertation l'École Royale de Marine du Havre (EHESS) and a second PhD in 1987 at Paris X-Nanterre with Les officiers généraux de la marine royale. He then went on to head the Maritime History Laboratory of CNRS-Paris IV-Sorbonne-Musée national de la Marine, and teach as a Modern History professor at Université de Savoie à Chambéry (1986-2000)

From 2000, he taught at the University in Tours as an 18th-century specialist, focusing on the society, shipping and travels of the era. He was President of the Société française d'histoire maritime (French maritime History association) until 2005.

Vergé-Franceschi  has published about 60 works, and edited the 2002 edition of the Dictionnaire d'histoire maritime.

Works

Les Officiers généraux de la Marine royale : 1715-1774 : origines, conditions, services

Articles

Notes and references 

Naval historians
21st-century French historians
20th-century French historians
1951 births
Living people